Knock Off is a 1998 action film directed by Tsui Hark and starring Jean-Claude Van Damme and Rob Schneider. The film was released in the United States on September 4, 1998.  The title is a double entendre, as the term colloquially refers to both counterfeit goods as well as targeted killing. The film is one of the last in the world to feature Kai Tak Airport still in use; the airport closed in 1998.

It was Hark's second and last American film; he returned to Hong Kong after Knock Off, feeling unsatisfied with his work in the United States. The film is also the second collaboration between Van Damme and de Souza, the first film being Street Fighter, released in 1994.

Plot
Russian agents searching for something underwater find a crate as Hong Kong police close in. They accidentally open the crate and baby dolls float to the surface before being detonated. Some Russian agents and a Hong Kong detective pursuing them survive.

Downtown, Tommy Hendricks is arranging a fashion show for "V-Six" Jeans. His partner, Marcus Ray shows up late after inspecting a warehouse of their goods where he sees several knock-offs, including the exploding dolls, peddled by a Hong Kong gangster, Skinny.  Marcus and Tommy then participate in a rickshaw race during which Marcus' adopted brother and friend Eddie cheats to win by switching with a body double. The body double gets kidnapped by Russian agents (looking for Eddie) and Marcus gives chase. Ultimately, they kill the fake Eddie and Hong Kong police arrest Marcus and Tommy, but release them without charges.

Back at their office, an executive from V-Six, Karen Lee claims a shipment of jeans was counterfeit and Marcus and Tommy are responsible for over $5 million of losses. She agrees to let it go if they go to the warehouse that switched the fake jeans and identify who did it. Meanwhile, the Russian bosses kill the agents who failed to reclaim the dolls and get tipped off by Skinny that V-Six is onto them and is going to their warehouse. When Tommy gets kidnapped at a restaurant, Marcus follows him and finds him talking to his CIA handlers. He is a CIA agent sent to discover the counterfeiters who used Marcus, "the king of knock offs," as his cover.

That night, before they arrive at the warehouse, a truck bursts out. Marcus gets on top of it and when it ultimately crashes they find it full of tiny discs. Tommy's boss, Harry Johansson determines they are powerful "nanobombs" at their base inside a Buddha statue.  Believing Eddie to be in on it, they go to see him. Eddie fingers Skinny as the counterfeiter; he found out they had bombs in the merchandise and tried to have it dumped in the ocean before the Russians found them. He opens a safe to give them proof, but it explodes, killing him. Tommy and Marcus have to fight their way out of the building. Tommy obtains security footage on the way out.

Marcus kidnaps Skinny and takes him back to the CIA base in the Buddha. There, the security footage reveals Karen was in the warehouse just before they were. At the office, she handcuffs Tommy and prepares to question him.  After Marcus leaves, the Buddha explodes, and Marcus races to the office to save Tommy. After a fight, she reveals she's CIA as well, and the three team up.  While Marcus changes, the Russians kidnap Karen and Tommy, and Marcus finds a bomb detector in Karen's things. He realizes the jean studs are the nanobombs and checks the computer for the shipping manifest. He and the Hong Kong detective from the opening scene race to the cargo ship where Karen and Tommy are being held.

Tommy is relieved to see Harry on board, but Harry reveals he is a double agent intending to ransom companies for not detonating the nanobombs they have been secretly planting in manufactured goods all over the world. Marcus and the detective board the barge and fight through all of the Russians, eventually escaping just before Harry detonates it. Karen plants a handful of the nanobombs on Harry's boat as well, which explodes. They find the detonator in the water and take it.

Two hours later, Tommy and Marcus talk in a bar. Tommy still has the detonator. In a distant room, Harry, still alive, is planting nanobombs on a toy. Tommy carelessly activates the detonator, destroying the building Harry is in, in the distance.

Cast
Jean-Claude Van Damme as Marcus Ray
Rob Schneider as Tommy Hendricks
Lela Rochon as Karen Lee
Michael Fitzgerald Wong as Detective Han
Carman Lee as Ling Ho
Paul Sorvino as Harry Johansson
Wyman Wong as Eddie Wang
Glen Chin as Skinny Wang
Wes Wolff as Dinger
Moses Chan as Officer Wong

Production
The film was announced at the 1997 American Film Market.

The film’s music was credited to Ron and Russell Mael of American new wave band Sparks. In an interview with historian and critic Aaron Hillis, they noted that, although they maintained a positive friendship with Tsui Hark through their attempts to produce a film adaptation of Mai, the Psychic Girl, due to studio pressure the score ultimately ended up being more the work of additional music composer Varouje Hagopian than them.

Release
Knock Off opened in the United States on September 4, 1998.  It took the 4th spot and grossed in $5,516,2311 at 1800 theaters, at an average of $3,064 for the weekend. From there it grossed a total of $10.3 million in US ticket sales.

Reception
Knock Off holds an 10% approval rating on Rotten Tomatoes based on 40 reviews. The site's consensus states: "Muddled plot; stiff acting." Audiences polled by CinemaScore gave the film an average grade of "D+" on an A+ to F scale.

Joe Leydon of Variety called it "an exuberantly cheesy action opus" that is made worth watching by Tsui Hark's directing despite its confusing and formulaic plot. Paul Tatara of CNN wrote that it is "the most incomprehensible mess I've ever had to sit through", and Jeff Vice of the Deseret News called it "incompetent in almost every aspect of filmmaking".  Kevin Thomas of the Los Angeles Times, however, called it Van Damme's best film to date and said it has crossover appeal due to its humor.

References

External links
 
 
 
 

1998 films
1998 action comedy films
American action comedy films
Hong Kong action comedy films
1990s English-language films
English-language Hong Kong films
Films set in Hong Kong
TriStar Pictures films
Films directed by Tsui Hark
Films shot in the Philippines
Films with screenplays by Steven E. de Souza
Films set in 1997
1990s American films
1990s Hong Kong films